Alfred Bannwarth (1903–1969) was a German neurologist who is credited for first reporting lymphocytic meningoradiculitis.

Biography

Early life and education 

After first studying music, Bannwarth studied medicine  in Munich, Germany, and later became an assistant to German neurologist Max Nonne in Hamburg.

Military service 

Bannwarth enlisted as a military doctor in the German military in 1945. During his service, he was stationed in the valley of Lake Tegern, where he was captured by American soldiers and held prisoner until June 1946.

References

Further reading

"Chronische lymphocytäre Meningitis, entzündliche Polyneuritis und 'Rheumatismus'. Ein Beitrag zum Problem 'Allergie und Nervensystem'." Archiv für Psychiatrie und Nervenkrankheiten, Berlin, 1941, 113: 284–376.
"Zur Klinik und Pathogenese der 'chronischen lymphocytären Meningitis'." Archiv für Psychiatrie und Nervenkrankheiten, Berlin, 1944, 117: 161–185, 682–716.

External links
Who Named It?

Lyme disease researchers
German neurologists
1903 births
1970 deaths
20th-century German physicians